The 2018 NCAA National Collegiate Women's Ice Hockey Tournament involves eight schools in single-elimination play to determine the national champion of women's NCAA Division I college ice hockey. The quarterfinals will be played at the campuses of the seeded teams on Saturday, March 10, 2018. The Frozen Four will be played on March 16 and 18, 2018 at Ridder Arena in Minneapolis, Minnesota. The University of Minnesota will host the tournament. This will be the fourth time that Ridder Arena will host the Frozen Four and the sixth time it has been played in Minneapolis. This will be the second year that the Big Ten Network will air the Championship Game live and the first year the semifinals will be aired live on BTN.

Qualifying teams 
In the fourth year under this qualification format, the winners of all four Division I conference tournaments received automatic berths to the NCAA tournament. The other four teams were selected at-large. The top four teams were then seeded and received home ice for the quarterfinals.

Bracket 
Quarterfinals held at home sites of seeded teams

Championship Game Officials: Referee Scott Roth, Shane Paskey Linesmen: Mike Mueller, Glendon Seal

Note: * denotes overtime period(s)

Results

National Quarterfinals

(1) Clarkson vs. Mercyhurst

(4) Boston College vs. Ohio State

(2) Wisconsin vs. Minnesota

(3) Colgate vs. Northeastern

National Semifinals

(1) Clarkson vs. Ohio State

(2) Wisconsin vs. (3) Colgate

National Championship

(1) Clarkson vs. (3) Colgate

Media

Television
Big Ten Network televised the semifinals and championship during their multi-year contract to carry the event.

Broadcast assignments
Women's Frozen Four and Championship
Dan Kelly, Sonny Watrous, and Allison Hayes (BTN)

References 

NCAA Women's Ice Hockey Tournament
1